Denis Charles Potvin (born October 29, 1953) is a Canadian former professional ice hockey defenceman and team captain for the New York Islanders of the National Hockey League (NHL). He is a four-time Stanley Cup winner as a member of the early 1980s New York Islanders. Potvin is also a three-time James Norris Memorial Trophy winner as the NHL's top defenceman. He was elected to the Hockey Hall of Fame in 1991 and served as a commentator for Ottawa Senators' television broadcasts on Sportsnet. Potvin is the former color commentator for the Florida Panthers. In 2017, he was named one of the "100 Greatest NHL Players" in history.

Biography

Playing career
After a stellar junior hockey career with the Ottawa 67s, Potvin was drafted first overall in the 1973 NHL Amateur Draft by the struggling expansion New York Islanders, a team which had recorded the worst record in modern NHL history the previous season. Right after Bill Torrey drafted Potvin, Montreal Canadiens general manager Sam Pollock approached Torrey, hoping to trade for Potvin. Pollock's strategy was to offer a "quick-fix" package of mature players to exchange for the top draft pick. Torrey ultimately turned down the offer since he felt Potvin would be a long-term asset to his team.

Upon joining the Islanders, Potvin wanted to wear number 7 on his uniform but was forced to take number 5, as forward Germain Gagnon was wearing number 7. Potvin entered the NHL with high expectations; he was regarded by some as the savior of the Islanders' franchise, and by others as potentially the next Bobby Orr. While he did not dominate the game in the same way as Orr, Potvin became an immediate star: He won the Calder Memorial Trophy as rookie of the year in 1973–74 and the James Norris Memorial Trophy as league's top defenceman in 1975–76 ending Orr's eight year reign. At age 22, Potvin scored 31 goals and 98 points, the highest totals by a defenceman other than Orr. That year he finished second to Bobby Clarke in the voting for the Hart Memorial Trophy as the NHL's most valuable player.

Upon Orr's decline and retirement in the late 1970s, Potvin became widely acknowledged (along with Larry Robinson) as the premier defenceman in the game. He also won the Norris Trophy in 1977–78 and 1978–79. The latter was his best offensive season, when he scored 31 goals and 70 assists in only 73 games, becoming the second defenceman (Orr being the first) to score 100 points in a season. He had an impressive +71 plus-minus rating that season and finished fourth in the balloting for the Hart Trophy. Between 1974–75 and 1980–81, Potvin was named to the NHL's first all-star team five times and the second all-star team once; the only season he missed the all-star teams was 1979–80, when he was only able to play 31 games due to injury.

In Potvin's best season, 1978–79, the talented but young Islanders ultimately lost in semi-finals of the 1979 Stanley Cup playoffs to the New York Rangers in six games, despite being heavily favoured to win the series. Clark Gillies stepped down as captain during the off-season and Potvin became the team's third captain, a position he held until relinquishing it in 1987. In 1979–80, Potvin's first year as captain, the Islanders won their first of four Stanley Cups. Potvin was a key part of the Islanders during the team's early 1980s glory years: in addition to the four consecutive Stanley Cup championships and five straight finals appearances, in the eight seasons he served as captain, the Islanders never failed to reach the Stanley Cup playoffs. Potvin was very productive offensively in the playoffs, with his best year being 1980–81 when he scored 8 goals and 17 assists for 25 points in 18 games. However, he was never able to win the Conn Smythe Trophy as the playoff's most valuable player. In the 1983–84 season, Potvin made a comeback of sorts, scoring 85 points and making the NHL's second all-star team.

Potvin was known for being intelligent, articulate, and outspoken off the ice. Throughout the 1970s, these traits often alienated his Islander teammates, as they made Potvin appear arrogant. He offended many hockey fans by stating publicly he had played better in the 1976 Canada Cup than Bobby Orr, and that Orr's selection as tournament MVP was for sentimental reasons. However, as Potvin matured, he became seen as a great leader as he learned to use these same qualities to positively affect his teammates.

Potvin was a more traditional defender than Orr and an extremely physical player. He averaged just under one point per game over his career (0.992), while Orr averaged 1.39 points per game. Late in his career, Potvin suffered a series of injuries that impeded his performance, leading to his retirement following the 1987–88 season. He retired as the NHL's leader in goals and points by a defenceman. His career totals were later surpassed by Ray Bourque, Paul Coffey, and others, and as of 2014, he sits fifth in career goals and seventh in career points amongst defencemen. 

Potvin claimed to have received an offer from Mike Keenan to come out of retirement and play for the arch-rival New York Rangers in 1993. Keenan has yet to substantiate these claims. Potvin admitted that although he believed it was a joke, he did contemplate a comeback. After a brief skate, he decided his body could no longer handle the rigours of the game.

Broadcasting
Potvin was a studio analyst for SportsChannel America television broadcasts from 1988–92, paired with host Bob Papa. Potvin was a color commentator for Florida Panthers television broadcasts from 1993, paired with play-by-play announcers Jeff Rimer, Dave Strader, and Steve Goldstein for over 16 seasons before being replaced by former Panthers player Bill Lindsay in 2009.

In September 2010, Potvin was hired as the Ottawa Senators' television colour commentator, working with Dean Brown on Rogers Sportsnet. In August 2014, he was rehired as colour commentator by the Florida Panthers, working with Steve Goldstein on Fox Sports Florida. As a colour commentator, he is known for his bizarre and inflammatory comments, such as claiming that Daniel and Henrik Sedin "...only use [their] fingers to lick the peanut butter off their bread". On July 29, 2019, he retired from broadcasting.

Personal life
Potvin was born in Vanier, Ontario, but grew up in nearby Hull, Quebec. Potvin's brother, Jean Potvin, was also an NHL defenseman  and the brothers were teammates for a number of years with the Islanders. Jean died in 2022.  Both were cousins of former NHL player Marc Potvin, who died in 2006.

Career statistics

Regular season and playoffs

* Stanley Cup Champion.

International

Career achievements, records and facts
 Retired having scored 310 goals and 742 assists for 1,052 points (at the time, the NHL career leader in all those categories for defensemen ) in 1,060 games, adding 1,356 penalty minutes.
 First NHL defenseman to reach 300 goals in regular season, and 1,000 career points.
 First player to reach 100 playoff assists in NHL history.
 Retired as the NHL career leader in playoff goals, assists, and points for defensemen.
 Led the 1976 Canada Cup tournament in assists (8), points (9), and penalty minutes (16).
 Won the James Norris Memorial Trophy as the NHL's best defenseman in 1976, 1978, and 1979.
 In 1991, he was inducted into the Hockey Hall of Fame and Ottawa Sports Hall of Fame.
 His jersey #5 was retired by the Islanders on February 1, 1992, the first such honor bestowed by the franchise.
 In 1998, he was ranked number 19 on The Hockey News' list of the 100 Greatest Hockey Players.
 In 2002, he was inducted into the Nassau County Sports Hall of Fame.
 One of only three players (Bryan Trottier and Josh Bailey being the others) to play 1,000 games in an Islanders uniform.

See also
 Notable families in the NHL
 Captain (ice hockey)
 List of NHL players with 1,000 points
 List of NHL players with 1,000 games played

References

External links
 
 

1953 births
Calder Trophy winners
Canadian ice hockey defencemen
Florida Panthers announcers
Franco-Ontarian people
Hockey Hall of Fame inductees
Ice hockey people from Ottawa
Ice hockey people from Gatineau
James Norris Memorial Trophy winners
Living people
National Hockey League All-Stars
National Hockey League broadcasters
National Hockey League first-overall draft picks
National Hockey League players with retired numbers
New York Islanders announcers
New York Islanders draft picks
New York Islanders players
Ottawa 67's players
Ottawa Senators announcers
Stanley Cup champions
Canadian expatriate ice hockey players in the United States